Adihalli (Channarayapatna)  is a village in the southern state of Karnataka, India. It is located in the Channarayapatna taluk of Hassan district in Karnataka.

See also
 Hassan
 Districts of Karnataka

References

External links
 

Villages in Hassan district